Freidbergia is a genus of tephritid  or fruit flies in the family Tephritidae.

Species
Freidbergia mirabilis Merz, 1999

References

Tephritinae
Tephritidae genera
Diptera of Africa